Starfire is the first album by Jørn Lande's solo project Jorn. It was released on 21 November 2000.

It has mainly a melodic hard rock sound and several cover songs of his favorite bands. The album features members of his two then-current bands Ark and Millenium.

Lande said in interviews that the album is more of a demo thing than a full-length album with high production, which was much more improved on his next albums.

Track listing
Music and lyrics written by Jørn Lande except where noted.

 "Starfire" - 4:50
 "Edge of the Blade" (Jonathan Cain, Steve Perry, Neal Schon) (Journey cover) - 4:21
 "Break It Up" (Mick Jones) (Foreigner cover) - 4:16
 "Forever Yours" (Jørn Lande, Jon Anders Narum) - 3:56
 "The Day the Earth Caught Fire" (Lol Mason, Mike Slamer, Max Thomas) (City Boy cover) - 5:12
 "Gate of Tears" - 5:05
 "Burn" (Ritchie Blackmore, David Coverdale, Jon Lord, Ian Paice) (Deep Purple cover) - 6:13
 "End Comes Easy" (Jørn Lande, Jon Anders Narum) - 4:08
 "Just the Same" (Craig Chaquico, Jeannette Sears, Eric VanSoest) (Jefferson Starship cover) - 5:29
 "Abyss of Evil" - 4:23

Personnel
Jørn Lande - lead vocals
Tore Moren - guitar 
Ralph Santolla - guitar 
Shane French - guitar 
Ronni Le Tekrø - guitar 
Tore Østby - guitar and bass guitar 
Sid Ringsby - bass guitar 
John Macaluso - drums 
Willy Bendiksen - drums 
Dag Stokke - keyboards 
Jon A. Narum - guitar, bass guitar, drums, keyboards and samples

References

2000 debut albums
Jørn Lande albums
Frontiers Records albums